Tyler County Speedway is a 1/4 mile dirt oval located in Tyler County, southeast of Middlebourne, West Virginia. Located at the Tyler County Fair Grounds, it hosts many large races such as the Hillbilly 100, Earl Hill Memorial, Topless 50, Eaton/Childers 'King of the Ring', Jackpot 100, and the Mega 100. Classes currently raced at Tyler County Speedway are Super Late Models, FASTRAK Late Models, EDGE Modifieds, EDGE Hot Mods, Modlites, and Mini Wedges. 

Many national and regional touring series call on Tyler County Speedway throughout the racing season including the Lucas Oil Late Model Dirt Series, World of Outlaws Late Model Series, Renegades of Dirt, Buckeye Outlaw Sprint Series, and BRP Big Block Modifieds.

Dirt oval race tracks in the United States
Motorsport venues in West Virginia
Buildings and structures in Tyler County, West Virginia
Tourist attractions in Tyler County, West Virginia